"I Hate Rock 'n' Roll" is a song by the Scottish alternative rock group The Jesus and Mary Chain.  It was first released as a single on CD and 10" vinyl in mid-1995, and went on to reach #61 in the UK single charts.  The 10" format was numbered and limited to 5000 copies, although additional copies are rumored to exist.  This single was the band's last release on Blanco y Negro Records, for whom they had recorded since 1985.

In the US, the four tracks were only available on Hate Rock 'n' Roll, the band's third compilation album, released later in 1995 by American Recordings.

A reworked version of the track, retitled "I Love Rock 'n' Roll", was later included on the group's sixth album, Munki, released in 1998.

Track listing
Numbered 10" (NEG 81TEX) and CDS (NEG81CD)
"I Hate Rock 'n' Roll" (William Reid) - 3:46
"Bleed Me" (Jim Reid) - 3:37
"33" (J. Reid) - 3:17
"Lost Star" (W. Reid) - 2:05

Personnel

The Jesus and Mary Chain
 Jim Reid - vocals, guitar, production
 William Reid - vocals, guitar, production
 Ben Lurie - bass, guitar
 Nick Sanderson - drums

Additional personnel
 Dick Meaney - engineer

References

The Jesus and Mary Chain songs
1995 singles
Songs written by William Reid (musician)
Songs about rock music
1995 songs